Sir Simon Charles Wessely  (born 23 December 1956) is a British psychiatrist. He is Regius Professor of Psychiatry at the Institute of Psychiatry, King's College London and head of its department of psychological medicine, vice dean for academic psychiatry, teaching and training at the Institute of Psychiatry, as well as Director of the King's Centre for Military Health Research. He is also honorary consultant psychiatrist at King's College Hospital and the Maudsley Hospital, as well as civilian consultant advisor in psychiatry to the British Army. He was knighted in the 2013 New Year Honours for services to military healthcare and to psychological medicine. From 2014 to 2017, he was the elected president of the Royal College of Psychiatrists.

Training
After attending King Edward VII School in Sheffield from 1968 to 1975, Wessely studied at Trinity Hall, Cambridge (BA 1978), University College, Oxford (BM BCh 1981), and the London School of Hygiene and Tropical Medicine (MSc 1989). In 1993 the University of London conferred upon him the degree of Doctor of Medicine.

Wessely completed a medical rotation in Newcastle. After attaining medical membership he studied psychiatry (his primary interest) at the Maudsley in 1984. His 1993 doctoral thesis was on the relationship between crime and schizophrenia. Post-doctoral studies included a year at the National Hospital for Neurology and Neurosurgery and a year studying epidemiology at the London School of Hygiene and Tropical Medicine. In 1999 he was elected fellow of the UK Academy of Medical Sciences (FMedSci).

Wessely's main research interests lie in the "grey areas" between medicine and psychiatry, clinical epidemiology and military health. His first paper was entitled "Dementia and Mrs. Thatcher", since then he has published over 600 papers on subjects including epidemiology, post traumatic stress, medicine and law, history of psychiatry, chronic pain, somatisation, Gulf War syndrome, chemical and biological terrorism and deliberate self-harm. He has published most widely on aspects of chronic fatigue syndrome, including its aetiology, history, psychology, immunology, sociology, epidemiology and treatment.

Work on chronic fatigue syndrome
In the first years after the introduction of the diagnosis chronic fatigue syndrome the condition was often mocked in the media, for example being described as "yuppie flu". Wessely and his co-workers verified that this stereotype was inaccurate, substantiating an association between autonomic dysfunction and chronic fatigue syndrome and providing reliable data on the prevalence of CFS in the community, showing that it has become an important public health issue. Other work on CFS included the development of new measurement tools, establishing the lack of relationship between hyperventilation and CFS, discovery of an endocrine "signature" for CFS that differed from depression and that prior depressive illnesses were likely linked to the condition in some cases.

Wessely and his colleagues, using randomised controlled trials and follow-up studies, developed a rehabilitation strategy for patients that involved cognitive behavioural and graded exercise therapy, that is claimed to be effective in reducing symptoms of CFS (a condition that otherwise lacks a cure or unequivocally successful treatment) in ambulant (non-severely affected) patients. Other studies looked at the professional and popular views of CFS, neuropsychological impairment in CFS, and cytokine activation in the illness. Some of his other written work includes a history of CFS, numerous reviews, and co-authoring the 1998 book Chronic fatigue and its syndromes. He has also established the first National Health Service programme solely devoted to patients with CFS, and continues to provide ongoing treatment with patients at King's College Hospital.

Wessely believes that CFS generally has some organic trigger, such as a virus, but that the role of psychological and social factors are more important in perpetuating the illness, otherwise known as the 'cognitive behavioural model' of CFS, and that treatments centred around these factors can be effective. He describes the cognitive behavioural model as follows: "According to the model the symptoms and disability of CFS are perpetuated predominantly by dysfunctional illness beliefs and coping behaviours. These beliefs and behaviours interact with the patient's emotional and physiological state and interpersonal situation to form self-perpetuating vicious circles of fatigue and disability... The patient is encouraged to think of the illness as 'real but reversible by his or her own efforts' rather than (as many patients do) as a fixed unalterable disease".

In an interview with the BMJ, Wessely said that although viruses and other infections are clearly involved in triggering the onset of CFS, “we’re not going to go doing more and more tests to find out what was the virus because, frankly, even if we found it there's nothing we're going to do about it. We're in the business of rehabilitation.” He used the analogy of a hit-and-run accident in which finding out the manufacturer or number plate of the car that hits you doesn't assist the doctor in trying to mend the injury.

Commenting on a now-retracted science paper that stated XMRV virus was found in two-thirds of CFS patients, Wessely said this research fails to model the role that childhood abuse, psychological factors, and other infections may play in the illness.

Opposition and criticism
In an interview published by The Lancet, Wessely discusses the controversy relating to his work on Gulf War syndrome and chronic fatigue syndrome. With hindsight he states that he was keen to get published, could have been more diplomatic, and is now better at handling controversy. He has been described as both "the most hated doctor in Britain" and "one of the most respected psychiatrists working in Britain today".

Although Wessely has studied physical markers, and allows the possibility of a biological basis to CFS, he is not confident of such a basis, and remains sceptical. He has also suggested that campaigners are motivated "not so much by a dispassionate thirst for knowledge but more by an overwhelming desire to get rid of the psychiatrists" from the area of chronic fatigue syndrome, despite having himself published research which concluded that "the stereotype of CFS sufferers as perfectionists with negative attitudes toward psychiatry was not supported". When asked about severely affected bed-ridden patients, Wessely said "in that kind of disability, psychological factors are important and I don't care how unpopular that statement makes me."

Malcolm Hooper, the Countess of Mar, and others have strongly criticised Wessely. In a 2002 article on chronic fatigue syndrome, The Guardian characterized the criticisms of one group of patients as a "vendetta." Wessely has repeatedly stated he has been the subject of numerous threats and personal attacks, and that "militants" have even made threats to his life. "It is a relentless, vicious, vile campaign designed to hurt and intimidate...For some years now all my mail has been x rayed. I have speed dial phones and panic buttons at police request and receive a regular briefing on my safety and specific threats."  Wessely gave up research into CFS around 2001, and as of 2011 his clinical work was with members of the armed forces; he said: "I now go to Iraq and Afghanistan, where I feel a lot safer".

Military health
Wessely's work was the first to show that service in the 1991 Gulf War had had a significant effect on the health of UK servicemen and women. Other work suggested a link to particular vaccination schedules used to protect against biological warfare, and also a link with psychological stress. His group also confirmed that classic psychiatric injury, post-traumatic stress disorder (PTSD), was not a sufficient explanation for the observed health problems. He and his colleagues in the medical school showed persisting evidence of immune activation, but failed to show that exposure to organophosphate or cholinesterase inhibitor agents had caused chronic neurological damage. The group also showed that many veterans who left the Armed Forces with persisting mental health problems have found it difficult to access National Health Service (NHS) services.

While this work, Wessely's evidence to the Lloyd Inquiry, and the work of other investigators was crucial in categorising Gulf War syndrome as a verifiable consequence of service in the Gulf, which resulted in affected Gulf War veterans being able to receive war pensions, Wessely does not believe that Gulf War syndrome exists as a distinct illness, stating "Is there a problem? Yes there is. Is it Gulf War syndrome or isn't it? I think that's a statistical and technical question that's of minor interest". Instead Wessely favours psychological explanations for what he views to be a 'Gulf War health effect' which he believes to be caused by stress, specifically troops' anxiety about chemical weapons and vaccines, as well as misinformation about Gulf War syndrome.

He is a trustee of the charity Combat Stress that provides help for service personnel with mental health problems and recently spent a sabbatical in the Department of War Studies at King's College London.

President of Royal College of Psychiatrists
In 2014, Wessely was elected president of the Royal College of Psychiatrists. He has used his position to argue for better resources for mental health and the treatment of mental disorders   and holding the government to account. This included drawing attention to the large disparity between those receiving any form of treatment for physical disorders such as diabetes and those with serious mental health problems, making the case that we can successfully treat many mental health problems, and that patients with disorders do get better. He also argued that there were dangers in pulling out of the European Convention on Human Rights.

As president he has been a regular media spokesperson such as on BBC current affairs programme Panorama, and that killings by those with mental illness are both unusual and declining. He has argued against making benefits conditional on co operating with mental health treatments, as subsequently accepted by the Carol Black report  and warned psychiatrists against diagnosing Donald Trump, no matter how tempting this may be.

He has also claimed to oppose lazy or negative stereotypes and images of psychiatry  and false dichotomies  such as “physical versus mental”  or “drugs versus talking”  and instead putting forward more positive images. For example, on Any Questions in August 2014, he opposed the motion proposed by Will Self that psychiatrists were to blame for the current epidemic of mental disorders.

During the junior doctors dispute he continued to emphasise support for junior psychiatrists  whilst arguing that the deeper causes of the dispute went beyond   pay and hours, comparing junior doctors careers to “being shuffled around the country like lost luggage”   and that it is impossible go on increasing demand and expectations with diminishing resources.

Wessely was succeeded as president by Professor Wendy Burn in June 2017.

Review of the Mental Health Act
In October 2017 the Prime Minister Theresa May announced that she had chosen Wessely to conduct a review of the Mental Health Act. He stated in an interview with the Huffington Post "Reviewing the act isn’t just about changing the legislation. In some ways that might be the easy part. The bigger challenge is changing the way we deliver care so that people do not need to be detained in the first place. In my experience it is unusual for a detention to be unnecessary -- by the time we get to that stage people are often very unwell, and there seems few other alternatives available."

Other interests
Wessely also has a long-standing interest in how normal people react to adversity, and what, if any, responses are appropriate. He was a co-author of an influential Cochrane Review showing that the conventional intervention for disaster survivors – to offer immediate psychological debriefing – was not only ineffective, but possibly did more harm than good. Since then he has published on civilian reactions to the Blitz, and latterly an early study of reactions to the 7 July 2005 London bombings, the Litvinenko affair, and swine flu.

In many venues, he has argued that people are more resilient than we give them credit for, and that the best thing we can do in the immediate aftermath of trauma is to offer practical support and encourage people to turn to their own social networks, such as family, friends, colleagues or family doctor. However, after a few months, when most distress has reduced, then for the minority who are still psychologically distressed or disabled it is appropriate to offer evidence-based psychological interventions.

After the GermanWings tragedy he suggested that we should not jump to conclusions such as banning all pilots from flying who had a history of depression (as opposed to current depression). He argued that the skies would be safer if pilots felt that the best way to be able to continue their careers was by being open and honest about their mental health, and not covering up, which would be the consequence of a lifetime ban. He advised the Civil Aviation Authority with the result that no such ban was instituted, but mental health assessments were improved. He worked with the CAA and BALPA to achieve his proposals.

During the 2016 EU referendum he was one of the leaders of the Healthier IN campaign, making the case for science and health.

He was a member of the Mental Health Taskforce, chaired by Paul Farmer, which led to the Five Year Forward View for Psychiatry.

He was instrumental in setting up the Commission on Acute Psychiatric Care, chaired by Lord Crisp, to investigate the increasing numbers of inappropriate out of area placements – over 5,000 patients a year being seen and hospitalised outside their local area, sometimes at the other end of the country.  The report made recommendations which were incorporated into the Five year Forward View for Mental Health, accepted by NHS-England.

Personal life 
Wessely's father Rudi came to the UK in August 1939, one of the children rescued by Nicky (Sir Nicholas) Winton. Nearly all of Rudi's family, including his parents, were murdered during the Holocaust. His father was the first of the “children” to meet Winton nearly 40 years later. He has spoken passionately about issues affecting refugees supporting Alf Dubs legislation.

Wessely is married to Clare Gerada; they have two sons. His interests include skiing and history, and he cycled annually from London to Paris between 2006 and 2012, to raise money for veterans' charities.

He appeared on the BBC celebrity radio show Desert Island Discs in March 2021.

Publications 
Wessely has co-authored books on CFS, psychological reactions to terrorism, randomised controlled trials, and a history of military psychiatry, From Shell Shock to PTSD.

Honours
For his work on CFS, Wessely was awarded the Jean Hunter Prize in 1997 by the Royal College of Physicians and was co-winner of the John Maddox Prize 2012 sponsored by Nature and the Ralph Kohn Foundation, and organised by Sense about Science on whose advisory council he serves. The award is given to individuals who have promoted sound science and evidence on a matter of public interest, with an emphasis on those who have faced extreme difficulty or opposition in doing so, as Wessely has done in researching neuropsychiatric elements to CFS despite alleged threats to his life. Some, however, have objected to this award being given to him due to concerns over the quality of his research.

To balance these criticisms academic supporters would point out that he was appointed as a Foundation Senior Investigator of the National Institute for Health and Care Research (NIHR), which is given on very strict criteria including analysis of metrics/citations. The college of NIHR Senior Investigators is drawn from the most pre-eminent NIHR-funded researchers selected through annual competitions. He was also elected Fellow of the Academy of Medical Sciences, the medical equivalent of the Royal Society, in 1999. Only 40 are honoured per year, and it is the highest honour and professional recognition in UK academic medical science.

His 2013 Knighthood was for services to Military healthcare and psychological medicine.

In 2014, Wessely was elected president of the Royal College of Psychiatrists. He announced his priorities to include parity between physical and mental health, improving the image of psychiatry and psychiatrists, improving recruitment into the specialism, and ensuring excellence in education and training.

He was named in the Health Service Journal Top 100 Clinicians 2014, 2015.  Listed in Debrett's Top 500 as one of the 7 most influential doctors in the country.

In 2013 he led the successful bid to the National Institute for Health Research to establish a Health Protection Research Unit (HPRU) for Emergency Preparedness and Response which he now chairs.

In July 2017 he became the first psychiatrist to be elected as President of the Royal Society of Medicine.

In February 2017 he was appointed as Regius Professor of Psychiatry at King's College London, the first Regius Chair at KCL and the first in psychiatry anywhere in the United Kingdom.

On 26 June 2019 he was awarded an Honorary Doctorate of Science by the University of Oxford.

On May 6, 2021, he was elected a Fellow of the Royal Society.

References

External links
 

 Sir Simon Wessely's blog
 KCL staff page
 KCL.ac.uk – The King's Centre For Military Health Research (KCMHR) is a joint initiative of the Institute of Psychiatry and the Department of War Studies at King's College London (Wessely's webpage at King's College)
 KCL.ac.uk – "Health & Wellbeing of UK Armed Forces Personnel: Professor Simon Wessely – Principal Investigator", KCMHR
 'Something old, something new, something borrowed, something blue: The true story of Gulf War Syndrome', lecture given at Gresham College, 25 January 2006 (available in text, audio and video formats)
 NATO.int – 'NATO-Russia Advanced Research Workshop on Social and Psychological Consequences of Chemical, Biological, and Radiological Terrorism', Simon Wessely, North Atlantic Treaty Organization ( 25–27 March 2002)
 Project-Syndicate.org – 'The Trouble with Treating Trauma', Simon Wessely (August 2003)
 'Shell Shock or Cowardice? – The case of Harry Farr', lecture given at Gresham College, 1 October 2008 (available in text, audio and video formats)

1956 births
Living people
Alumni of Trinity Hall, Cambridge
Alumni of University College, Oxford
Alumni of the London School of Hygiene & Tropical Medicine
Academics of King's College London
Chronic fatigue syndrome
English psychiatrists
Fellows of the Academy of Medical Sciences (United Kingdom)
Fellows of the Royal College of Physicians
NIHR Senior Investigators
Knights Bachelor
Military psychiatrists
People educated at King Edward VII School, Sheffield
Presidents of the Royal Society of Medicine
Fellows of King's College London
John Maddox Prize recipients